Miguel Guzmán may refer to:

 Miguel Guzmán (golfer) (born 1961), Argentine professional golfer
 Miguel Guzmán Miranda (born 1996), Mexican footballer
 Miguel Guzmán (wrestler) (1916–1973), Mexican professional wrestler